This article lists important figures and events in Malaysian public affairs during the year 1985, together with births and deaths of notable Malaysians.

Incumbent political figures

Federal level
Yang di-Pertuan Agong: Sultan Iskandar
Raja Permaisuri Agong: Sultanah Zanariah
Prime Minister: Dato' Sri Dr Mahathir Mohamad
Deputy Prime Minister: Dato' Musa Hitam
Lord President: Mohamed Salleh Abas

State level
 Sultan of Johor: Tunku Ibrahim Ismail (Regent)
 Sultan of Kedah: Sultan Abdul Halim Muadzam Shah
 Sultan of Kelantan: Sultan Ismail Petra
 Raja of Perlis: Tuanku Syed Putra
 Sultan of Perak: Sultan Azlan Shah (Deputy Yang di-Pertuan Agong)
 Sultan of Pahang: Sultan Ahmad Shah
 Sultan of Selangor: Sultan Salahuddin Abdul Aziz Shah
 Sultan of Terengganu: Sultan Mahmud Al-Muktafi Billah Shah
 Yang di-Pertuan Besar of Negeri Sembilan: Tuanku Jaafar
 Yang di-Pertua Negeri (Governor) of Penang: Tun Dr Awang Hassan
 Yang di-Pertua Negeri (Governor) of Malacca: Tun Syed Ahmad Al-Haj bin Syed Mahmud Shahabuddin
 Yang di-Pertua Negeri (Governor) of Sarawak:
 Tun Abdul Rahman Ya'kub (until February)
 Tun Ahmad Zaidi Adruce Mohammed Noor (from February)
 Yang di-Pertua Negeri (Governor) of Sabah: Tun Mohd Adnan Robert

Events
 January - Tunku Osman Becomes Tunku Johore.
 11 January – The Kompleks Tun Abdul Razak (KOMTAR) in Penang, at the time the tallest building in Southeast Asia, was officially opened by Prime Minister Mahathir Mohamad.
 30 March – The Malaysian Parliament celebrated the 25th anniversary of its formation.
 April – The first Belilah Barangan Buatan Malaysia (Made in Malaysia) campaign was launched.
1 June -- TV3's 1st Anniversary 1985 Ulang Tahun Pertama TV3
 2 June – Malaysia's first teletext service, Beriteks was launched.
 8 July – The new Tabung Haji building at Jalan Tun Razak, Kuala Lumpur was officially opened by Prime Minister Mahathir Mohamad.
 10 July – The first Malaysian national car Proton Saga was officially launched by Prime Minister Mahathir Mohamad.
 2 August – Official opening ceremony of the Penang Bridge by Prime Minister Mahathir Mohamad. He drove across the bridge in a red Proton Saga carrying the national flag to officiate the opening ceremony.
 31 August – The Proclamation of Independence Memorial (formerly The Malacca Club) in Malacca Town, Malacca was officially opened by Prime Minister Mahathir Mohamad.
 2 September – Sultan Salahuddin Abdul Aziz Shah of Selangor celebrated the silver jubilee (25th anniversary) of his throne.
 2 September – The Putra World Trade Centre (PWTC), Malaysia's first convention and exhibition centre, was officially opened by Prime Minister Mahathir Mohamad and the 1985 UMNO General Assembly was held in Dewan Merdeka, PWTC for the first time.
 14 September – The Penang Bridge officially opened to traffic.
 19 November – The Memali Incident took place in the remote village of Memali near Baling, Kedah. About 14 civilians and four policemen were killed, including Islamic sect leader, Ibrahim Mahmud (Ibrahim Libya).
 9 December – Sultan Azlan Shah was installed as the 34th Sultan of Perak.

Births
7 February - Dina Nadzir, singer
22 June – Aaron Lim, racing driver
7 July – Zulkifli Che Ros, weightlifter
26 September – Cameron Tovey, Malaysian-Australian basketball player
18 September – Koo Kien Keat – Badminton player
11 December – Siow Yi Ting – Swimmer

Deaths
2 March – Tan Sri Runme Shaw – Chairman and founder of the Shaw Organisation of Singapore
9 September – Tan Sri Yaacob Abdul Latiff – 2nd Mayor of Kuala Lumpur
14 December – Tun Sardon Jubir – Former Minister of Works and Communications and fourth Yang di-Pertua Negeri of Penang (1975-1981)

See also
 1985
 1984 in Malaysia | 1986 in Malaysia
 History of Malaysia

 
Years of the 20th century in Malaysia
Malaysia
Malaysia
1980s in Malaysia